is a district of Minato, Tokyo, Japan. Literally meaning "Southern Azabu", Minami-Azabu was named so because it was situated in the southern portion of the former Azabu Ward.

The area's postal code is 106–0047.

Tokyo Metropolitan Central Library, located in Arisugawa-no-miya-Kinen Kōen (Arisugawa-no-miya Memorial Park), in western Minami-Azabu. South-Korean Mindan, VANK located in eastern Minami-Azabu. Temple University Japan Campus, located in south eastern Minami-Azabu.

Education

Minato City Board of Education operates public elementary and junior high schools.

Minami-Azabu 1-chōme 1-2 and 25-27 ban, 2-chōme 1, 9, and 14-ban, 3-chōme 1-21 ban, and 4-chōme 1-12 ban are zoned to Hommura (or Honmura) Elementary School (本村小学校)
Minami-Azabu 5-chōme is zoned to Kōgai Elementary School (笄小学校). Minami-Azabu 1-chōme 3-24 ban, and 2-chōme 2-8 and 10-13 ban are zoned to Higashimachi Elementary School (東町小学校). The Hommura and Kōgai elementary zones feed into Kōryō Junior High School (高陵中学校). The Higashimachi zone feeds into Roppongi Junior High School (六本木中学校). Minami-Azabu 2-chōme 15-ban, 3-chōme 22-ban, and 4-chōme 13-15 ban are zoned to Shirokane-no-Oka Gakuen (白金の丘学園) for elementary and junior high school.

Private schools:
 Tokyo International School

Subway stations
Hiroo Station
Azabu-Jūban Station
Shirokane-Takanawa Station

References

Districts of Minato, Tokyo